John Weber (1768–1815) was Speaker of the Pennsylvania House of Representatives in 1810.

John Weber was elected to the Pennsylvania House of Representatives from  Montgomery County in 1806 and served through 1811.  In October, 1810, the state government moved from Lancaster, Lancaster County, to Harrisburg, Dauphin County, where it remains.

See also
 Speaker of the Pennsylvania House of Representatives

References

Members of the Pennsylvania House of Representatives
Speakers of the Pennsylvania House of Representatives
Pennsylvania Whigs
19th-century American politicians
1768 births
1815 deaths